The men's 4 × 100 metres event at the 2013 Asian Athletics Championships was held at the Shree Shiv Chhatrapati Sports Complex on 6 July 2013

Medalists

*Athlete(s) who competed in heats only.

Results

Heats
First 3 in each heat (Q) and 2 best performers (q) advanced to the Final.

Final

References
Results

100 Men's Relay
Relays at the Asian Athletics Championships